Denis C. Connaghan (born 9 January 1976) is a Scottish retired footballer who made over 100 appearances in the Scottish League for Queen's Park as a defender.

Personal life 
Connaghan is the son of retired footballer Denis Connaghan.

Honours 
Partick Thistle

 Scottish League First Division: 2001–02

Queen's Park
 Scottish League Second Division: 1999–00

References

External links 

 

Scottish footballers
Scottish Football League players
Queen's Park F.C. players
Association football defenders
1976 births
Footballers from Glasgow
Benburb F.C. players
Partick Thistle F.C. players
Stenhousemuir F.C. players
Living people
Neilston Juniors F.C. players
Scottish Junior Football Association players
Clydebank F.C. (1965) players